Nils Sandström (9 August 1893 – 17 June 1973) was a Swedish sprinter who competed at the 1920 Summer Olympics. He won a bronze medal in the 4 × 100 m relay, but failed to reach the finals of individual 100 m and 200 m events.

Between 1917 and 1925 Sandström collected 23 medals at the Swedish Championships. He was the 1919–20 champion in the 100 m, and won eight titles in the 4 × 100 m (1919–21, 1923) and 4 × 400 m relays (1919–22). He never won the 200 m Swedish title despite holding the national record in this event in 1917–1920.

References

1893 births
1973 deaths
Athletes from Gothenburg
Swedish male sprinters
Olympic bronze medalists for Sweden
Athletes (track and field) at the 1920 Summer Olympics
Olympic athletes of Sweden
Medalists at the 1920 Summer Olympics
Olympic bronze medalists in athletics (track and field)
20th-century Swedish people